RGHS may refer to:
 Raymond Gardiner High School, North Caicos, Turks and Caicos Islands (United Kingdom)
 Randwick Girls' High School, Randwick, New South Wales, Australia
 Rangamati Government High School, Rangamati, Bangladesh
 Rochester Regional Health (Formerly Rochester General Health System) in Rochester, New York, United States
 Rotorua Girls' High School, Rotorua, New Zealand